The Constitution of the Republic of Korea is the supreme law of South Korea. It was promulgated on July 17, 1948, and last revised on October 29, 1987.

Background

The Provisional Charter of Korea 
The preamble of the Constitution of South Korea states that the document was established in the spirit of "upholding the cause of the Provisional Republic of Korea Government", the Korean government exiled after the imposition of Japanese colonial rule of Korea. As such, the founding document of the provisional government—The Provisional Charter of Korea—serves as the basis for the current constitution. Promulgated in 1919, the charter first gave the country the "Republic of Korea" name and laid out the ideas forming the backbone of later South Korean constitutions.

These ten articles are:
 The Republic of Korea is a democratic republic country.
 The Republic of Korea should be governed by the provisional people of the provisional government.
 All citizens of the Republic of Korea are equal without gender, wealth and stratum.
 All citizens of the Republic of Korea have the rights to be free of religion, media, writing, publishing, association, assembly, the charge of address, body and ownership.
 The citizens who have the qualification of the citizen of the Republic of Korea have a right to vote and to be elected.
 The citizens of the Republic of Korea have a duty to education, taxation, and military service.
 The Republic of Korea will join the League of Nations in order to exert its founding spirit in the world and to contribute to human culture and peace by the will of God.
 The Republic of Korea gives preference to the old imperial family.
 The Republic of Korea forbids the punishment of life, body, and licensed prostitution.
 The Provisional Government convenes the National Assembly within one year after the restoration of the country.

History 
South Korea's first 1948 Constitution, drafted by Dr. Chin-O Yu (Hangul: 유진오; Hanja 兪鎭午), framed a presidential system mixed with a parliamentary system. It gave the president to act as the head of state, be elected indirectly by the National Assembly, and share executive power with the cabinet. The Constitutional Charter of the Provisional Government of the Republic of Korea of 1919 became the forerunner of 1948 Constitution.

The 1948 Constitution was first amended in 1952 ahead of Syngman Rhee's re-election, providing for direct presidential elections and a bicameral legislature. It was passed with procedural irregularities after fierce debate. In 1954, Rhee again forced an amendment, removing term limits for himself and emphasizing a capitalistic economic model.

Rhee was overthrown in 1960 following widespread protests against his increasingly authoritarian rule. Partly in response to Rhee's abuses, the Second Republic turned to a parliamentary system. The 1960 Constitution provided for a figurehead president, a bicameral legislature, a cabinet headed by a prime minister, an election commission, and a constitutional court. It also provided for elections for supreme court justices and provincial governors, as well as natural law-based individual rights.

With the May 16 coup of Park Chung-hee in 1961, the 1960 version was nullified, and in 1962, the Third Republic's Constitution was passed. The  document returned to a presidential system. It had a number of similarities to the United States Constitution, such as presidential elections held by the National Assembly in the event of a tie and carrying out judicial review by the ordinary Supreme Court instead of a specialized Constitutional Court, though in practice military government would continue in some form until democratization. In 1972, Park extended his rule with the Fourth Republic's constitution, called the Yushin Constitution, which gave the president sweeping (almost dictatorial) powers and permitted him to run for an unlimited number of six-year terms.

After Park was assassinated in 1979, the Fifth Republic began with the 1980 Constitution under President Chun Doo-hwan. The president's powers were curbed somewhat. He was limited to a single seven-year term, with no possibility of reelection. As with the Yushin Constitution, it provided for a presidential electoral college and a semi-presidential system of government. Critically, however, the President retained the right to suspend civil liberties and rule by decree.

With the pro-democratic protests of 1987 (June Democracy Movement), the 1988 Constitution of the Sixth Republic was passed. The constitutional bill was passed by the National Assembly on October 12, 1987, and approved by 93 percent in a national referendum on October 28, taking effect on February 25, 1988, when Roh Tae-Woo was inaugurated as president. The president's powers were curtailed and the constitutional court was restored.

Amendment of the Constitution of South Korea

Succession of spirit 

The spirit of April Nineteenth and March 1st Movement is stipulated in the preamble of the Constitution of South Korea. However, it took a long time to be established. The contents of the April Revolution were removed on the fifth amendment, and these were included in the preamble on the sixth amendment, identified with May 16 coup. After the ninth amendment, the spirit of the April Revolution was excepted from the preamble, and it was included for the "Resistance ideology for protection of democratic constitution" on the 10th amendment.

Structure 
Consisting of a preamble, 130 articles, and supplementary provisions, the Constitution provides for an executive branch headed by a president and an appointed prime minister, a unicameral legislature called the National Assembly, and a judiciary consisting of the Constitutional Court, Supreme Court and lower courts.

In detail, the Constitution is composed of ten Chapters. Chapter I provides general constitutional ground for the Republic of Korea itself and citizens. Chapter II provides basic rights for individuals. Other following Chapters from III to VII describe constitutional institutions constituting national governance structure of the Republic of Korea; for example, parliament as the National Assembly (Chapter III), executive branch as the President and the Prime Minister (Chapter IV), ordinary courts and military courts including the Supreme Court of Korea (Chapter V), constitutional court as Constitutional Court of Korea (Chapter VI), independent electoral management institution as the National Election Commission (Chapter VII). Also, Chapter VIII provides constitutional ground for local governments and their autonomy. Chapter IX address general provisions for economic system of the Republic of Korea. Finally, Chapter X stipulates procedure for amendment on the Constitution.

The President is elected by a first-past-the-post voting system and limited to a single five-year term. The Prime Minister is appointed by the President with the consent of the National Assembly.  The President also appoints members of the State Council, the Cabinet, on the advice of the Prime Minister, as well as Cabinet Ministers on the advice of the Prime Minister from among the members of the State Council.

The National Assembly consists of at least 200 (presently 300) members elected to four-year terms. The Supreme Court's chief justice and President of the Constitutional Court are appointed by the President of South Korea with consent of the National Assembly. Supreme Court Justices other than the Chief Justice (exact number is set by statute) are appointed by the President of South Korea on the recommendation of the chief justice with the approval of the National Assembly. Also, Constitutional Court Justices other than the President of the Court are appointed by the President of South Korea upon nomination of equal portions from the National Assembly, the Supreme Court Chief Justice and themselves. The President of the Constitutional Court of South Korea serves a six-year term.

The Constitution declares South Korea a "democratic republic" (took from Article 1 of Constitutional Charter of the Provisional Government of the Republic of Korea of 1919), its territory consisting of "the Korean Peninsula and its adjacent islands," and that "The Republic of Korea shall seek unification and shall formulate and carry out a policy of peaceful unification based on the principles of freedom and democracy." There are disputes over what "freedom and democracy" are in Korean, but the direct translation of the Korean word used in the constitution "" would be liberal democracy.

Individual rights 
South Korean Bill of Rights (or fundamental right) is Constitution CHAPTER 2. RIGHTS AND DUTIES OF CITIZENS (4-687)
Individuals may not be punished, placed under preventive restrictions, or subjected to involuntary labor except as provided by law. Those detained or arrested must be informed of the reason and of their right to an attorney, and family members must be informed. Warrants must be issued by a judge "through due procedures," and accused persons may sue for wrongful arrest in certain cases.

Economic provisions 
In Article 119, stable and balanced growth rates, "proper distribution of income", and preventing "abuse of economic power" are explicitly listed as goals of the government. The regulatory goal to "democratize the economy through harmony among economic agents" in the same article reflects the strong prevalence of traditional Korean values and the close relationship between politics and the economy. Article 125 designates foreign trade as a strategic area to be fostered, regulated and coordinated by the government.
The Constitution affirms both the right and the duty to work, requiring regulation of minimum wages and working conditions.  Workers have the right to independent association, collective bargaining, and collective action.

Political neutrality 
Political neutrality is a constitutional convention which provides that public servants should avoid activities likely to impair, or seem to impair, their political impartiality or the political impartiality of the public service. The political neutrality of South Korea's Constitution is guaranteed in the area of military, administration, and education. In the form of the guarantee of 'political neutrality', the constitution provides an objective legal system to guarantee political neutrality as an essential element of the system, unlike the form of guarantee of basic rights.

Military 
Article 5 (2) of the Constitution stipulates that "the ROK military shall fulfill the sacred duty of national security and defense of the nation, and its political neutrality shall be obeyed" .

Education 
Education promotes the potential of individuals so that individuals can develop their personality in each area of life. In view of the important functions of education, Article 31(6) of the Constitution stipulates to specify in the law about the basic laws and regulations about the education system and its operation, education finances and the status of teachers.

Administration 
Political neutrality of public officials is specified in the law. Article 6(2) of the Constitution stipulates that "The status and political neutrality of public officials shall be guaranteed by law". Also, Article 9(1) of the Public Service Elections act regulates that Public servants or any other person (including any organization or organizations) that is required to be in a political neutrality shall not engage in any unfair influence on the election or otherwise act on the election results. Article 65 of the Public Officials Act (Prohibition of Political Movement) Section 2 regulates that Public officials shall not engage in the following activities to support or oppose a specific political party or a particular person in an election.
1. To make an invitation to vote or not
2. Pray, preside, or recommend the signatory movement.
3. To publish or post documents or books to public facilities
4. To make a donation recruitment, or to use public funds
5. To encourage others to join or not to join a political party or other political organizations

Constitutional Court 

Following the 1987 revision, the Constitutional Court was established in September 1988 by Chapter VI of the Constitution. Though earlier versions of the Constitution provided for various forms of judicial review, the judiciary's lack of independence at the time prevented it from exercising this function. This historical background led drafters of current Constitution of South Korea to greatly empower the Constitutional Court.

Related articles of the Constitution 
Articles 111 through 113 of the Constitution of the Republic of Korea refer to the Constitutional Court.

 Article 111 : This article stipulates the enforcement of the Constitutional Court and the qualifications and appointments of the Constitutional Court Judges.
 Article 111(1) : Paragraph (1) of Article 111 sets the Court's jurisdiction, as  Judicial review on constitutionality of statute, review of all Impeachments, decision on Prohibition and Dissolution of political parties, competence dispute about demarcation of power among central government agencies and local governments, and adjudication of constitutional complaint. For more information, see jurisdiction.
 Article 111(2), (3) : Paragraph (2) and (3) of Article 111 sets qualification and appointment process of Justices of the Court. Number of Constitutional Court Justices are exactly stipulated as nine, according to paragraph (2) of Article 111. For more information, see Justices of the Court.
 Article 111(4) : This paragraph sets appointment process for the President of the Court. For more information, see the President of the Constitutional Court of Korea.
 Article 112 : This article stipulates term and ethical obligations of Constitutional Court Justices and guarantee of their status.
 Article 112(1) : Paragraph (1) sets term of the Constitutional Court Justices as renewable six years.
 Article 112(2) : Paragraph (2) specifies ethical obligations of the Constitutional Court Justices. To protect political neutrality, they should not join any political party, nor shall participate in political activities.
 Article 112(3) : Paragraph (3) guarantees that Constitutional Court Justices cannot be removed at will from their office. Unlike Justices at the Supreme Court of Korea, Constitutional Court Justices enjoy more reinforced guarantee of status since they cannot be ordered to retire due to unbearable mental or physical impairment. For more information, see article 106(2) of the Constitution and the tenure of Supreme Court Justices.
 Article 113 : This article provides constitutional ground for quorum and organizational autonomy of the Court.
 Article 113(1) : According to the paragraph (1) of the article, to make decision upholding requests for the Adjudication, or to change precedent, the Court needs votes from at least six Justices among quorum of at least seven Justices. For more information, see Quorum of the Court.
 Article 113(2) : This paragraph empowers the Court to enact sub statutory rules for internal issues, including specific process of adjudication and other organizational issues inside the Court. As one of highest constitutional institution of South Korea, the Court enjoys organization autonomy from other constitutional institutions.
 Article 113(3) : This paragraph is constitutional ground for statute called 'Constitutional Court Act', which regulates and specifies exact boundary of jurisdiction, autonomy and power of the Court.

See also 

 History of South Korea
 Elections in South Korea
 Government of South Korea
 Constitutional Court of Korea
 List of national constitutions

References

External links 

 Constitutional Court of Korea, English website
 The Constitution of the Republic of Korea (translated into English), Korea Legislation Research Institute
 Constitutional Court Act (translated into English), Korea Legislation Research Institute
 U.S. Library of Congress - Country Studies

Law of South Korea
South Korea